Capistrano Unified School District (CUSD) is the largest school district in Orange County, California, United States. It is the 8th largest district in the state and the 78th largest in the country. The district currently has 54,036 students and administers 33 elementary schools, two K-8 schools, ten middle schools, six comprehensive high schools, five charter schools, and multiple alternative education programs.

CUSD has 40 California Distinguished Schools, 11 National Blue Ribbon Schools, 19 Golden Bell winning programs, and 36 California Business Honor Roll Schools, among many other award-winning schools and school programs. The district has a graduation rate of 97.2%, much higher than California's average of 85.1%. Every CUSD high school is ranked in the top 1000 US high schools by U.S. News & World Report.

Formed in 1965, Capistrano Unified School District encompasses  and employs 3,992 people, making it the largest employer in South Orange County. With Laguna Beach Unified School District, it is part of the College and Career Advantage (formerly South Coast Regional Occupational Program) (ROP).

Service area 
The school district serves all or part of the following cities and unincorporated areas:
 Aliso Viejo
 Coto de Caza
 Dana Point
 Dove Canyon
 Ladera Ranch
 Laguna Beach
 Laguna Niguel
 Las Flores
 Mission Viejo
 Rancho Mission Viejo
 Rancho Santa Margarita
 San Clemente
 San Juan Capistrano
 Wagon Wheel

Schools

Elementary schools
Aliso Viejo
Canyon Vista Elementary School (California Distinguished School and California Business for Education Excellence "Scholar" School)
Don Juan Avila Elementary School (California Distinguished School and California Business for Education Excellence "Scholar" School)
Oak Grove Elementary School (California Distinguished School and California Business for Education Excellence "Scholar" School)
Wood Canyon Elementary School (California Distinguished School)
Dana Point
Palisades Elementary School
R.H. Dana Elementary School (California Distinguished School and National Blue Ribbon School)
R.H. Dana Exceptional Needs Facility
Ladera Ranch
Chaparral Elementary School (California Distinguished School and California Business for Education Excellence "Scholar" School)
Ladera Ranch Elementary School (California Business for Education Excellence "Scholar" School)
Oso Grande Elementary School (California Business for Education Excellence "Scholar" School)
Laguna Niguel
Crown Valley Elementary School (California Distinguished School)
George White Elementary School (California Distinguished School and California Business for Education Excellence "Scholar" School)
Hidden Hills Elementary School (California Distinguished School)
John S. Malcom Elementary School (California Distinguished School, National Blue Ribbon School, and California Business for Education Excellence "Scholar" School)
Laguna Niguel Elementary School (California Distinguished School and California Business for Education Excellence "Scholar" School)
Marian Bergeson Elementary School (California Distinguished School and California Business for Education Excellence "Scholar" School)
Moulton Elementary School (California Distinguished School, National Blue Ribbon School, and California Business for Education Excellence "Scholar" School)
Las Flores
Wagon Wheel Elementary School (California Business for Education Excellence "Scholar" School)
Mission Viejo
Bathgate Elementary School (California Distinguished School, National Blue Ribbon School, and California Business for Education Excellence "Scholar" School)
Castille Elementary School (California Distinguished School and California Business for Education Excellence "Scholar" School)
Phillip Reilly Elementary School (California Distinguished School and National Blue Ribbon School
Viejo Elementary two-way language immersion school 
Rancho Santa Margarita
Las Flores Elementary School (California Distinguished School and California Business for Education Excellence "Scholar" School)
Tijeras Creek Elementary School (California Distinguished School and California Business for Education Excellence "Scholar" School)
San Clemente
Clarence Lobo Elementary School (California Distinguished School)
Concordia Elementary School (California Distinguished School and California Business for Education Excellence "Scholar" School)
Las Palmas Elementary two-way language immersion school (California Distinguished School)
Marblehead Elementary School
Truman Benedict Elementary School (California Distinguished School and California Business for Education Excellence "Scholar" School)
Vista del Mar Elementary School (California Distinguished School and California Business for Education Excellence "Scholar" School)
San Juan Capistrano
Del Obispo Elementary School (California Distinguished School)
Harold Ambuehl Elementary School (California Distinguished School)
Kinoshita Elementary School
San Juan Elementary two-way language immersion school

K-8 schools
Arroyo Vista K-8 School (California Distinguished School and California Business for Education Excellence "Scholar" School)
Capistrano Home School
Carl Hankey K-8 International Baccalaureate World School (California Gold Ribbon School and California Business for Education Excellence "Star" School)
Esencia K-8 School

Middle schools
Aliso Viejo
Aliso Viejo Middle School (California Distinguished School and California Business for Education Excellence "Scholar" School)
Don Juan Avila Middle School (California Distinguished School and California Business for Education Excellence "Scholar" School)
Ladera Ranch
Ladera Ranch Middle School (California Distinguished School and California Business for Education Excellence "Scholar" School)
Laguna Niguel
Niguel Hills Middle School (California Distinguished School and California Business for Education Excellence "Scholar" School)
Mission Viejo
Newhart Middle School (California Distinguished School, National Blue Ribbon School, and California Business for Education Excellence "Scholar" School)
Rancho Santa Margarita
Las Flores Middle School (California Distinguished School and California Business for Education Excellence "Scholar" School)
San Clemente
Bernice Ayer Middle School (California Distinguished School and California Business for Education Excellence "Scholar" School)
Shorecliffs Middle School (California Distinguished School)
Vista del Mar Middle School (California Distinguished School and California Business for Education Excellence "Scholar" School)
San Juan Capistrano
Marco Forster Middle School (California Distinguished School and California Business for Education Excellence "Star" School)

High schools
Aliso Viejo
Aliso Niguel High School (California Distinguished School, National Blue Ribbon School, California Business for Education Excellence "Scholar" School, U.S. News/World Report "Best High School," Newsweek "Best High School," and US Department of Education New American High School)
Dana Point
Dana Hills High School (California Distinguished School, National Blue Ribbon School, California Business for Education Excellence "Scholar" School, and U.S. News/World Report "Best High School")
Las Flores
Tesoro High School (California Distinguished School, California Business for Education Excellence "Scholar" School, U.S. News/World Report "Best High School," and Newsweek "Best High School")
Mission Viejo
Capistrano Valley High School (California Distinguished School, California Business for Education Excellence "Scholar" School, U.S. News/World Report "Best High School," and International Baccalaureate World School)
San Clemente
San Clemente High School (California Distinguished School, California Business for Education Excellence "Scholar" School, U.S. News/World Report "Best High School," and  International Baccalaureate World School)
San Juan Capistrano
California Preparatory Academy virtual school
San Juan Hills High School (California Business for Education Excellence "Star" School, U.S. News/World Report "Best High School," and Newsweek "Best High School")

Alternative education programs
San Juan Capistrano
Capistrano Adult School
CUSD Adult Transition Program
Union High School (California Department of Education Model Continuation High School)

Student ethnicity

Controversies
In 1994, a science teacher refused to teach evolution because he felt it was a religion. In Peloza v. Capistrano School District, the Ninth Circuit Court of Appeals ruled in favor of the school district.

In 2012, Capistrano Unified School District was found guilty for the wrongful death of three-year old Kevin Cisler, who slowly asphyxiated to death on a bus ride home from preschool. The bus driver and CUSD employees failed to properly secure Kevin in his seat, which resulted in the child asphyxiating with the incorrect placement of his chest restraint and seat belt. In Cisler v. Capistrano Unified School District the jury found CUSD guilty and negligent in its actions.

In 2015, a principal was removed from San Clemente High School.  This prompted community outrage and resulted in the removal of the assistant superintendent.

Controversies regarding district management have prompted two efforts to recall school board members.

School board 
The Capistrano Unified School District has a seven-member board of trustees, with each trustee representing one of seven geographic areas within the school district. Each trustee is elected to a four-year term of office. Trustees must reside in the area they represent.

Current board of trustees:
Amy Hanacek, Area 1
Michael Parham, Area 2 
Lisa Davis, Area 3
Gary Pritchard, Area 4
Krista Castellanos, Area 5
Gila Jones, Area 6 
Judy Bullockus, Area 7

The board of trustees is the policy-making body for the school district. It is charged with providing a quality educational program for students in kindergarten through grade 12 in accordance with the California Constitution, the laws of the state, adopted board policies, and the desires of the community.

As elected officials, trustees are state officers responsible for the governance of a political subdivision of the state. The school district is independent of city and county governments, but cooperates with them. In addition to establishing school district policies, the board adopts an annual budget and approves all expenditures, employment decisions, curricula, textbooks, and courses of study, and makes decisions on school sites, building plans and construction contracts. Trustees have no power to act individually in the name of the board. Formal action can be taken only when the board is in session with a quorum of at least half of the trustees.

The superintendent
The administration of the school district is delegated by trustees to a professional administrative staff headed by the superintendent. The superintendent acts as secretary to the board of trustees.

Superintendents since unification:
1965-1969   Dr. Charles F. Kenney
1969-1975   Truman Benedict
1975-1991   Dr. Jerome R. Thornsley
1991-2006   Dr. James A. Fleming
2007-2007   Dr. Dennis Smith
2007-2009   Woodrow Carter
2010-2014   Dr. Joseph M. Farley
2014–2022 Kirsten M. Vital Brulte

See also

List of school districts in Orange County, California

References

External links
 

School districts in Orange County, California
Mission Viejo, California
School districts established in 1965
1965 establishments in California